Antwerpen-Centraal railway station (IATA code: ZWE), officially Antwerpen-Centraal, is the main railway station in Antwerp, Belgium. The station is operated by the National Railway Company of Belgium (NMBS/SNCB).

History

Early history
Antwerp's first station was the terminus of the Brussels–Mechelen–Antwerp railway line, which opened on 3 June 1836. The original station building was made of wood and was replaced by a new and larger building on the occasion of the opening of the new international connection to the Netherlands in 1854–55.

The current terminal station building was constructed between 1895 and 1905 as a replacement for the first station. The stone-clad building was designed by the architect Louis Delacenserie. The viaduct into the station is also a notable structure designed by local architect Jan Van Asperen. A plaque on the north wall bears the name Middenstatie ("Middle Station"), an expression now antiquated in Dutch. To the north of the station a large public square, known as the Statieplein ("Station Square"), was created, acting as an entry to the city for its many commuters. In 1935, the square's name was changed to the Koningin Astridplein, in honour of the recently deceased Queen Astrid.

World War II damage and restoration
During World War II, severe damage was inflicted to the train hall by the impact of V-2 rockets, though the structural stability of the building remained intact, according to the National Railway Company of Belgium. Nevertheless, it has been claimed that the warping of the substructure due to a V-2 impact had caused constructional stresses. The impact remains visible due to a lasting wave-distortion in the roofing of the hall.

In the mid-20th century, the building's condition had deteriorated to the point that its demolition was being considered. The station was closed on 31 January 1986 for safety reasons, after which restoration work to the roof (starting at the end of March 1986 and finishing in September 1986) and façades was performed. The stress problems due to the impact of bombs during the war were reportedly solved by the use of polycarbonate sheets instead of glass, due to its elasticity and its relatively low weight (40% less than glass), which avoided the need for extra supporting pillars. After replacing or repairing steel elements, they were painted burgundy. Copper was also used in the renovation process of the roof.

Expansion for high-speed trains
In 1998, large-scale reconstruction work began to convert the station from a terminus to a through station. A tunnel was excavated between Antwerpen-Berchem railway station in the south of the city and Antwerpen-Dam railway station in the north, passing under the Central Station, with platforms on two underground levels. This allows Thalys, HSL 4 and HSL-Zuid high-speed trains to travel through Antwerpen-Centraal without the need to turn around (the previous layout obliged Amsterdam–Brussels trains to call only at Antwerpen-Berchem or reverse at Central).

The major elements of the construction project were completed in 2007, and the first through trains ran on 25 March 2007. The station was awarded a Grand Prix at the European Union Prize for Cultural Heritage / Europa Nostra Awards in 2011.

Architecture
The station is widely regarded as the finest example of railway architecture in Belgium, although the extraordinary eclecticism of the influences on Delacenserie's design had led to a difficulty in assigning it to a particular architectural style. In W. G. Sebald's novel Austerlitz an ability to appreciate the full range of the styles that might have influenced Delacenserie is used to illustrate the brilliance of the fictional architectural historian who is the novel's protagonist. Owing to the vast dome above the waiting room hall, the building became colloquially known as the spoorwegkathedraal ("railroad cathedral").

The originally iron and glass train hall (185 metres long and 44 metres or 43 metres high) was designed by Clément Van Bogaert, an engineer, and covers an area of 12,000 square metres. The height of the station was necessary for dissipating the smoke of steam locomotives. The roof of the train hall was originally made of steel.

In 2009, the American magazine Newsweek judged Antwerpen-Centraal the world's fourth greatest train station. In 2014, the British-American magazine Mashable awarded Antwerpen-Centraal the first place for the most beautiful railway station in the world.

Station layout 
The station has four levels and 14 tracks arranged as follows:
 Level +1: The original station, 6 terminating tracks, arranged as two groups of three and separated by a central opening allowing views of the lower levels
 Level 0: Houses ticketing facilities and commercial space
 Level −1: 7 m below street level, 4 terminating tracks, arranged in two pairs separated by the central opening.
 Level −2: 18 m below street level, 4 through tracks, leading to the two tracks of the tunnel under the city (used by high-speed trains and domestic services towards the north).

Services
The station is served by the following services:

High speed services (Thalys) Amsterdam - Rotterdam - Antwerp - Brussels - Paris
High speed services (Thalys) Amsterdam - Rotterdam - Antwerp - Brussels - Lille
High speed services (Thalys) Amsterdam - Rotterdam - Antwerp - Brussels - Chambéry - Bourg-Saint-Maurice (in winter)
High speed services (Thalys) Amsterdam - Rotterdam - Antwerp - Brussels - Avignon - Marseille (in summer)
International Intercity services Amsterdam (12x a day) or The Hague HS (4x a day) - Rotterdam - Breda - Noorderkempen - Antwerp - Brussels Airport - Brussels
Intercity services (IC-02) Antwerp - Sint-Niklaas - Gent - Bruges - Ostend
Intercity services (IC-04) Antwerp - Sint-Niklaas - Gent - Kortrijk - Poperinge/Lille
Intercity services (IC-05) Antwerp - Mechelen - Brussels - Nivelles - Charleroi (weekdays)
Intercity services (IC-08) Antwerp - Mechelen - Brussels Airport - Leuven - Hasselt
Intercity services (IC-09) Antwerp - Lier - Aarschot - Leuven (weekdays)
Intercity services (IC-09) Antwerp - Lier - Aarschot - Hasselt - Liège (weekends)
Intercity services (IC-10) Antwerp - Mol - Hamont/Hasselt
Intercity services (IC-15) Noorderkempen - Antwerp
Intercity services (IC-22) Essen - Antwerp - Mechelen - Brussels (weekdays)
Intercity services (IC-22) Antwerp - Mechelen - Brussels - Halle - Braine-le-Comte - Binche (weekends)
Intercity services (IC-28) Antwerp - Sint-Niklaas - Gent (weekdays)
Intercity services (IC-30) Antwerp - Herentals - Turnhout
Intercity services (IC-31) Antwerp - Mechelen - Brussels - Nivelles - Charleroi (weekends)
Local services (L-22) Roosendaal - Essen - Antwerp - Puurs (weekdays)
Local services (L-22) Roosendaal - Essen - Antwerp (weekends)
Local services (L-23) Antwerp - Aarschot - Leuven
Local services (L-24) Antwerp - Herentals - Mol (weekdays)
Local services (L-30) Antwerp - Sint-Niklaas - Lokeren
Brussels RER services (S1) Antwerp - Mechelen - Brussels - Waterloo - Nivelles (weekdays)
Brussels RER services (S1) Antwerp - Mechelen - Brussels (weekends)

In popular culture

A staged "flash mob"-like event at the station in early 2009, featuring the song "Do-Re-Mi" from the Rodgers and Hammerstein musical The Sound of Music, became a viral video. It was performed by 200 dancers of various ages, along with several dozen waiting passengers who just jumped in and joined the dance themselves. The video was produced to publicize Op zoek naar Maria, the Belgian TV version of the BBC talent competition programme How Do You Solve a Problem Like Maria?, about the search for an actress to play the lead role in a stage revival of The Sound of Music.

The station is used in Agatha Christie's Poirot episode "The Chocolate Box" to represent a station in Brussels.

The beginning of Austerlitz, the final novel of the German writer W. G. Sebald is set in the station.

See also
 List of railway stations in Belgium

References

External links

Official station page at the NMBS website
360 panorama of station

Railway stations in Belgium
Railway stations in Antwerp
Public transport in Antwerp
Buildings and structures in Antwerp
Art Nouveau architecture in Belgium
1905 establishments in Belgium
Railway stations opened in 1905
Art Nouveau railway stations
Railway stations located underground in Belgium
Tourist attractions in Antwerp